Strikeforce: Heavy Artillery was a mixed martial arts event held by Strikeforce on May 15, 2010, in St. Louis, Missouri, United States at the Scottrade Center.  The event aired live on Showtime in the United States and on Super Channel in Canada.

Background
Fedor Emelianenko was rumored to face Fabrício Werdum at this event, but the match was later held in June at Strikeforce: Fedor vs. Werdum, where Werdum won by first round submission.

After a long period of ambiguity, Strikeforce officials confirmed that the main event was for Alistair Overeem's Heavyweight Championship, which he had never defended since winning it in November 2007.

The winner of the Antwain Britt vs. Rafael Cavalcante bout was promised the next shot at Muhammed Lawal's Light Heavyweight Championship.

Bobby Lashley, who was originally set to fight on the Strikeforce: Nashville card, was rumored to have fought on this card, however he was moved to the card for Strikeforce: Los Angeles.

Norifumi Yamamoto was originally announced to fight Federico Lopez on the card, but was later pulled out by Dream. The match was rescheduled for Dream 14 two weeks later, where Yamamoto defeated Lopez by first round TKO.

The event drew an estimated 308,000 viewers, with a peak at 448,000 on Showtime.

Results

References

See also
 Strikeforce (mixed martial arts)
 List of Strikeforce champions
 List of Strikeforce events
 2010 in Strikeforce

Heavy Artillery
2010 in mixed martial arts
Mixed martial arts in Missouri
Events in St. Louis
Sports in St. Louis
2010 in sports in Missouri